Oakland Grove Health Care Center is for profit health care center at 560 Cumberland Hill Road in Woonsocket, Rhode Island. The health care center offers 24-Hour Skilled Nursing Care, IV Therapies, Surgical Recovery, Stroke Recovery, Cardiac Recovery, Wound Management, Private Hospice Suites, On-site Podiatry, Optometry And Dental Services, Separate Rehabilitation Unit/Services Available Up.

See also
 List of hospitals in Rhode Island

References

External links
 

Organizations based in Rhode Island
Hospitals in Rhode Island